The Islander 21 is an American trailerable sailboat that was designed by Joseph McGlasson as a pocket cruiser and first built in 1965.

Production
The design was built by McGlasson Marine/Wayfarer Yachts in the United States, from 1965 to 1969, but it is now out of production.

Design
The Islander 21 is a recreational keelboat, built predominantly of fiberglass, with wood trim. It has a masthead sloop rig, a spooned raked stem, an angled transom, an internally mounted spade-type rudder controlled by a tiller and a fixed fin keel. It displaces  and carries  of iron ballast.

The boat is normally fitted with a small  outboard motor for docking and maneuvering.

The design has sleeping accommodation for four people, with a double "V"-berth in the bow cabin and two straight settees in the main cabin along with a dinette table. It has a galley and a head.

For sailing the design is equipped with a jib or a genoa.

Operational history
In a 2010 review Steve Henkel wrote, "we have no accommodations plan to show here, but her promotional literature says she 'is equipped with four full-length berths, galley, unusual dinette arrangement, modern head, and plenty of storage lockers.' That sounds good to us. The reported 1,000 pounds of ballast seems unusually large—more than half the total weight of the boat—leaving only 950 pounds for the hull, deck, rig, etc. That makes us wonder whether the numbers given in ads are incorrect ... Best and worst features: Not enough information available to comment."

See also
List of sailing boat types

References

Keelboats
1960s sailboat type designs
Sailing yachts
Trailer sailers
Sailboat type designs by Joseph McGlasson
Sailboat types built in the United States